The Olympic Games have been broadcast on Australian television since 1956, coinciding with both the introduction of television in Australia as well as the first year Australia hosted an Olympics. All three commercial networks have broadcast the Summer Olympics or Winter Olympics at least once, as have both public broadcasters and the dominant subscription television platform Foxtel, often sharing broadcasting rights with another network.

The Olympics is on the anti-siphoning list, meaning subscription television providers are banned from bidding for exclusive broadcasting rights, to ensure the sporting event is available on free-to-air television to all viewers.

History

1956
Television in Australia was launched in order to ensure the first Olympics to be held in Australia could be broadcast. The only three television stations in Melbourne and Sydney shared the rights. For technical reasons, Sydney viewers received pictures up to a day later than Melbourne viewers.

1960s
For the 1960 Olympics, held in Rome, the coverage was 100% bought in from one of the USA networks.  This was not modified AT ALL in consideration of the hugely enthusiastic Australian viewership. Enthusiasm quickly turned into a feeling of insult, as it was only if we figured prominently in any event, that there was any mention of Australians at all, and then, it seemed always in context of how and why the USA was unsuccessful. Compared to 1956, this coverage was deeply disappointing. 
A complete debacle.

1970s

1980s

1990s

2000s
Throughout the 2000s, the Seven Network held the broadcast rights to all the Summer and Winter Games, sharing rights with SBS in both 2004 and 2008. SBS primarily broadcast long form events and less popular sports.

Seven's coverage received multiple awards across the decade from the IOC at their media awards known as the Golden Rings. It was awarded 'Best Olympic Programme' in 2004, received three awards in 2006 and took the gold award for 'Best Olympic Programme' for the third year in a row in 2008.

2010s
The Nine Network and Foxtel jointly secured a broadcast rights package which included both the 2010 Winter Olympics and 2012 Summer Olympics, reportedly paying up to $120 million. It marked the first time a subscription television provider was an official Olympics broadcast partner in Australia. Foxtel provided 8 dedicated channels and was the first time more than one channel of Olympic coverage was offered, and also the first time Australian viewers could pay to access Olympic content beyond what was available on free to air television.

The International Olympic Committee initially attempted to sell broadcast rights for both the 2014 Winter Olympics and 2016 Summer Olympics as a package for the same price of $120 million it secured for the previous rights deal. However, it was forced to split the Winter games with broadcasters unwilling to meet the IOC's demands. It follows Nine losing up to $30 million on the 2012 Olympics as well as increasing costs of rights to domestic sports. Network Ten paid $20 million for the 2014 Winter Games. Its flagship nightly program was Sochi Tonight, and it marked the first time a network used a multichannel to air Olympic content, with ONE airing different content to the primary Ten channel.

In 2014, the IOC announced it had signed a deal estimated to be worth up to $170 million with the Seven Network to broadcast the following three Olympics, the 2016 and 2020 Summer and 2018 Winter Games. The 2016 Games was the first time a free to air broadcaster used two multichannels (7Two and 7mate) to air Olympic content in addition to their primary channel. It was also the first time a paid streaming service was made available, with a $19.95 premium app being offered.

Broadcasters

See also
Olympics on television
Olympics on Seven
Olympics on Nine
Olympics on Ten

References

 
Olympics on television
History of Olympic broadcasting
Seven Sport
Nine's Wide World of Sport
10 Sport